Two Men with the Blues is a live album by Willie Nelson and Wynton Marsalis. It was released on July 8, 2008 by Blue Note and sold 22,000 copies in it first week of release. It was recorded on January 12–13, 2007, at Jazz at Lincoln Center in New York City.

Track listing

Personnel
 Wynton Marsalis – trumpet and vocals
 Willie Nelson – vocals and guitar
 Walter Blanding – saxophone
 Dan Nimmer – piano
 Mickey Raphael – harmonica
 Carlos Henriquez – bass
 Ali Jackson – drums

Charts
The album held the number one position in the Billboard Jazz Albums chart for four weeks. It spent a total of 67 weeks on that chart. It peaked at number 20 on both the Billboard 200 and the Billboard Digital Albums charts, spending eight weeks and one week on the charts respectively.

References

External links
 Official site
 Willie Nelson's official website
 Wynton Marsalis's official website

Wynton Marsalis live albums
Collaborative albums
Live blues albums
2008 live albums
Live jazz albums
Willie Nelson live albums
Blue Note Records live albums
Albums recorded at the Lincoln Center for the Performing Arts